Stephan Franck is a Franco-American animator, writer, director, and comics creator. In 2013, he received an Annie Award nomination for Best Director for a direct to video or TV broadcast for The Smurfs: The Legend of Smurfy Hollow. In 2014, Franck was nominated for the Russ Manning Award for the first volume of Silver that he writes and illustrates. In 2017, it was announced that writer Andrew Cosby was attached to write a movie adaptation of the Silver series. Franck is also the co-creator of the animated TV show Corneil & Bernie.

Award nominations 
 Russ Manning Award Nomination – 2014 "Silver Volume 1" (Dark Planet)
 Annie Award Nomination – 2014 Outstanding Achievement, Directing in an Animated TV/Broadcast Production – The Smurfs: The Legend of Smurfy Hollow (Sony Pictures Animation)

References 

American comics creators
American animators
Year of birth missing (living people)
Living people
French animators
French comics artists
French animated film directors
American animated film directors
Sony Pictures Animation people